For St. Ignatius Church and Cemetery in Port Tobacco Maryland see St. Thomas Manor

Saint Ignatius Church and Cemetery is a historic church and cemetery at 101 N. Lamkin Road in Good Hart, Michigan, USA. The church was added to the Michigan Historical Register in 1976 and the National Register of Historic Places in 2007.

History

The area around what is now Good Hart has been an Odawa village (formerly known as Wa-Ga-Nak-A-Sa or Middle Village) since at least the 1700s. In 1741, a Roman Catholic chapel was established at this location in a bark longhouse. The first structure was replaced by a more substantial version, dedicated by Father Frederic Baraga, in 1833. That church was destroyed by fire on Easter Sunday, April 21, 1889.

Construction immediately began on the current church as a replacement. Father Servatius Altmicks from Harbor Springs hired a local carpenter to manage the construction, and much of the work was done by the local Odawa. The new church was dedicated by Rt. Reverend Bishop Richter on September 13, 1889.

The church has undergone a substantial restoration and is open to the public for Sunday mass in July and August, and for weddings and funerals. It is one of the four churches making up the Catholic community of L'Arbre Croche.

Description
Saint Ignatius Church is a white-painted wooden structure covered with clapboard, with a tall wooden steeple. Adjacent to the church is the Middle Village Cemetery, which contains rows of white crosses marking gravesites.

References

External links
US Genealogical Archives - cemetery photos

Cemeteries in Michigan
Churches on the National Register of Historic Places in Michigan
Gothic Revival church buildings in Michigan
Churches completed in 1889
Buildings and structures in Emmet County, Michigan
Historic districts on the National Register of Historic Places in Michigan
National Register of Historic Places in Emmet County, Michigan